The Arctic convoys of World War II were oceangoing convoys which sailed from the United Kingdom, Iceland, and North America to northern ports in the Soviet Union – primarily Arkhangelsk (Archangel) and Murmansk in Russia. There were 78 convoys between August 1941 and May 1945, sailing via several seas of the Atlantic and Arctic oceans, with two gaps with no sailings between July and September 1942, and March and November 1943.

About 1,400 merchant ships delivered essential supplies to the Soviet Union under the Anglo-Soviet agreement and US Lend-Lease program, escorted by ships of the Royal Navy, Royal Canadian Navy, and the U.S. Navy. Eighty-five merchant vessels and 16 Royal Navy warships (two cruisers, six destroyers, eight other escort ships) were lost.  Nazi Germany's Kriegsmarine lost a number of vessels including one battleship, three destroyers, 30 U-boats, and many aircraft. The convoys demonstrated the Allies' commitment to helping the Soviet Union, prior to the opening of a second front, and tied up a substantial part of Germany's naval and air forces.

Background 
In June 1941, Germany launched Operation Barbarossa, invading the USSR. The following month, Britain and the Soviet Union formed an alliance, the Anglo-Soviet Agreement. Britain was quick to provide limited materiel aid to the USSR beginning in August - including tanks and aircraft - in order to try to keep her new ally in the war against the Axis powers. One major conduit for supplies was through Iran. The two nations began a joint occupation of Iran in late August, to neutralize German influence. The Soviet Union joined the Second Inter-Allied Meeting in London in September. The USSR thereafter became one of the "Big Three" Allies of World War II along with Britain and, from December, the United States, fighting against the Axis Powers. The American Lend-Lease program was signed into law in March 1941. It provided Britain and the Soviet Union with limited war materiel beginning in October that year. The programme began to increase in scale during 1943. The British Commonwealth and, to a lesser extent, the Soviet Union reciprocated with a smaller Reverse Lend-Lease program.

Convoy organisation

After the first convoy, code-named  Operation Dervish in August 1941, the Arctic convoys ran in two series:
 The first series, PQ (outbound) and QP (homebound), ran from September 1941 to September 1942. These convoys ran twice monthly, with interruptions in the summer of 1942, when the series was suspended after the disaster of Convoy PQ 17, and again in the autumn after the final convoy of the series, Convoy PQ 18, because of the long daylight hours and the preparations for November 1942's Operation Torch.
 The second series of convoys, JW (outbound) and RA (homebound) ran from December 1942 until the end of the war, though with interruptions in the summer of 1943 and again in the summer of 1944.

The convoys ran from Iceland (usually off Hvalfjörður) and traveled north of Jan Mayen Island to Arkhangelsk when the ice permitted in the summer months, shifting south as the pack ice increased and terminating at Murmansk. From February 1942 they assembled and sailed from Loch Ewe in Scotland.

Outbound and homebound convoys were planned to run simultaneously; a close escort accompanied the merchant ships to port, remaining to make the subsequent return trip, whilst a covering force of heavy surface units was also provided to guard against sorties by ships such as  Tirpitz. Escorts would  accompany the outbound convoy to a cross-over point, meeting and then conducting the homebound convoy back,  while the close escort finished the voyage with its charges.

The route skirted  occupied Norway en route to the Soviet ports. Particular dangers included:
 the proximity of German  air, submarine and  surface forces
 the likelihood of severe weather
 the frequency of fog
 the strong currents and the mixing of cold and warm waters, which made ASDIC use difficult
 drift ice
 the alternation between the difficulties of navigating and maintaining convoy cohesion in constant darkness in winter convoys or being attacked around-the-clock in constant daylight in summer convoys

Notable convoys

 The "Dervish" convoy assembled at Hvalfjörður and sailed on 21 August 1941. It arrived at its destination, Archangel, ten days later. The convoy was relatively small and consisted of only six merchant ships: Lancastrian Prince, New Westminster City, Esneh, Trehata, the elderly Llanstephan Castle, the fleet oiler Aldersdale and the Dutch freighter Alchiba. The Commodore was Captain JCK Dowding RNR. The escorts comprised the ocean minesweepers HMS Halcyon, Salamander and Harrier, the destroyers HMS Electra, Active and Impulsive and the anti-submarine trawlers HMS Hamlet, Macbeth and Ophelia. As evidence of Churchill's astute mastery of propaganda, on board Llanstephan Castle were two journalists and the artist Felix Topolski.
 On 30 May 1942, the surviving ships of Convoy PQ 16 arrived, most ships to Murmansk and eight to Archangel; the convoy was such a success in terms of the war stores delivered that the Germans made greater efforts to disrupt the following convoys. The crane ships from PQ 16 including SS Empire Elgar stayed at Archangel and Molotovsk (now Severodvinsk) unloading convoys for over 14 months.
 In July 1942, convoy PQ 17 suffered the worst losses of any convoy in the Second World War. Under attack from German aircraft and U-boats, the convoy was ordered to scatter, following reports that a battle group, which included the battleship Tirpitz, had sailed to intercept the convoy (although the German group did not leave port until the following day, and was subsequently ordered to return to port). Only 11 of the 35 merchant ships in the convoy succeeded in running the gauntlet of U-boats and German bombers. The novel HMS Ulysses (1955) by Alistair MacLean contains fictional events reminiscent of PQ 17 and other historical events.
 The Battle of the Barents Sea: In December 1942, German surface forces, including the heavy cruiser Admiral Hipper and pocket battleship Lützow, sailed to intercept Convoy JW 51B. The German force was driven off by a combined force of destroyers and cruisers.
 In December 1943, Convoy JW 55B was the target of the German battleship Scharnhorst. Two British warship forces were in the area. German destroyers missed the convoy, which had been diverted north based on intelligence from the Norwegian resistance movement.

List of Arctic convoys

1941

1942

1943

1944

1945

Purpose and strategic impact

Cargo included tanks, fighter planes, fuel, ammunition, raw materials, and food.  The early convoys in particular delivered armoured vehicles and Hawker Hurricanes to make up for shortages in the Soviet Union. The Arctic convoys caused major changes to naval dispositions on both sides, which arguably had a major impact on the course of events in other theatres of war. As a result of early raids by destroyers on German coastal shipping and the Commando raid on Vågsøy, Hitler was led to believe that the British intended to invade Norway again.  This, together with the obvious need to stop convoy supplies reaching the Soviet Union, caused him to direct that heavier ships, especially the battleship Tirpitz, be sent to Norway.  The Channel Dash was partly undertaken for this reason.

As a "fleet in being", Tirpitz and the other German capital ships tied down British resources which might have been better used elsewhere, for example combating the Japanese in the Indian Ocean. The success of Gneisenau and Scharnhorst in Operation Berlin during early 1941 had demonstrated the potential German threat. As the Allies closed the air gap over the North Atlantic with very long range aircraft, Huff-Duff (radio triangulation equipment) improved, airborne centimetric radar was introduced and convoys received escort carrier protection, the scope for commerce raiding diminished.

Aside from an abortive attempt to interdict PQ12 in March 1942 and a raid on Spitsbergen in September 1943, Tirpitz spent most of the Second World War in Norwegian fjords. She was penned in and repeatedly attacked until she was finally sunk in Tromsø fjord on 12 November 1944 by the Royal Air Force (RAF). Other Kriegsmarine capital ships either never got to Norway (e.g. Gneisenau), were chased off, or were sunk by superior forces (e.g. Scharnhorst). In particular, the unsuccessful attack on convoy JW-51B (the Battle of the Barents Sea), where a strong German naval force failed to defeat a British escort of cruisers and destroyers, infuriated Hitler and led to the strategic change from surface raiders to submarines. Some capital ships were physically dismantled and armament used in coastal defences.

Leningrad under the siege was one of important destinations for supplies from the convoys. From 1941 food and munition supplies were delivered from British convoys to Leningrad by trains, barges, and trucks. Supplies were often destroyed by the Nazi air-bombings, and by Naval Detachment K while on the way to Leningrad. However, convoys continued deliveries of food in 1942, 1943, and through 1944. Towards the end of the war the material significance of the supplies was probably not as great as the symbolic value hence the continuation—at Stalin's insistence—of these convoys long after the Soviets had turned the German land offensive.

It has been said that the main value of the convoys was political, proving that the Allies were committed to helping the Soviet Union at a time when they were unable to open a second front.

British intelligence

Ultra signals intelligence gained from the German Enigma code being broken at Bletchley Park played an important part in the eventual success of the convoys. German documents related to the Enigma coding machine were captured during the commando raids of Operation Archery and Operation Anklet (27 December 1941). The documents enabled the British to read messages on the home waters naval Enigma used by surface ships and U-boats in the Arctic (Heimisch, later Hydra network; Dolphin to the British) for the rest of the war. In January 1942 reinforcements of Luftwaffe bombers, torpedo-bombers and long range reconnaissance aircraft were sent to northern Norway and new command organisations established at Stavanger and Kirkenes, followed by Fliegerführer Lofoten who was charged with the defence of Norway and offensive operations against Allied convoys. The three U-boats in the area were increased to nine and another six were distributed between Bergen, Trondheim and Narvik to reconnoitre and oppose Allied landings. In May, all the U-boats came under Arctic Command and on 23 May, Admiral Scheer and Prinz Eugen joined Tirpitz at Trondheim, followed by Admiral Hipper; by 26 May Lützow had arrived at Narvik.

The British read these moves from Ultra intercepts and traffic analysis from the RAF Y-station at RAF Cheadle, which eavesdropped on communications between Luftwaffe aircraft and ground stations. Prinz Eugen was badly damaged by a torpedo and the Admiralty was informed of the hit by an Enigma intercept the next day. The information could not always be acted upon because much of it was obtained at short notice but the intelligence did allow the Royal Navy to prepare for battle and convoys could be given appropriate escorting forces.

Literary depictions
The 1955 novel HMS Ulysses by Scottish writer Alistair MacLean, considered a classic of naval warfare literature and the 1967 novel The Captain by Dutch author Jan de Hartog are set during the Arctic convoys. The two books differ in style, characterisation and philosophy (de Hartog was a pacifist, which cannot be said about MacLean). Both convey vividly the atmosphere of combined extreme belligerent action and inhospitable nature, pushing protagonists to the edge of endurance and beyond. The Norwegian historic account One in Ten Had to Die (Hver tiende mann måtte dø) also 1967 by writer Per Hansson is based on the experience of the Norwegian sailor Leif Heimstad and other members of the Norwegian merchant fleet during World War II. The 1973 Russian novel Requiem for Convoy PQ-17 (Реквием каравану PQ-17) by writer Valentin Pikul depicts the mission of Convoy PQ 17, reflecting the bravery and courage of ordinary sailors in the merchant ships and their escorts, who took mortal risks to provide Allied aid.

Other supply convoys
The Arctic route was the shortest and most direct route for lend-lease aid to the USSR, though it was also the most dangerous.
Some 3,964,000 tons of goods were shipped by the Arctic route; 7 percent was lost, while 93 percent arrived safely. This constituted some 23 percent of the total aid to the USSR during the war. The Persian Corridor was the longest route (and the only all-weather route) to the USSR, but was not fully operational until mid-1942. Thereafter it saw the passage of 4,160,000 tons of goods, 27 percent of the total. The Pacific route opened in August 1941, but was affected by the start of hostilities between Japan and the US with the Attack on Pearl Harbor. After December 1941, only Soviet ships could be used and as Japan and the USSR observed a strict neutrality towards each other, only non-military goods could be transported. Nevertheless, 8,244,000 tons of goods went by this route, 50 percent of the total.

A branch of the Pacific Route began carrying goods through the Bering Strait to the Soviet Arctic coast in June 1942. From July through September small Soviet convoys assembled in Providence Bay, Siberia to be escorted north through the Bering Strait and west along the Northern Sea Route by icebreakers and Lend-Lease Admirable class minesweepers. A total of 452,393 tons passed through the Bering Strait aboard 120 ships. Part of this northern tonnage was fuel for the airfields along the Alaska-Siberia Air Route. Provisions for the airfields were transferred to river vessels and barges on the estuaries of large Siberian rivers. Remaining ships continued westbound and were the only seaborne cargoes to reach Archangel while J W convoys were suspended through the summers of 1943 and 1944.

See also

 Rösselsprung ("Knight's Move") — German naval campaign to sink Arctic convoys
 Northwest Staging Route —  Aviation supply route from North America to Siberia used by Allied forces
 Operation Wunderland
 List of merchant ships lost in Convoy PQ 17
 Arctic Ocean operations of World War II
 Arctic Star
 Don't Play the Fool... — A Russian comedy partly based on the life of a war veteran in Arctic convoys.
 HMS Ulysses (novel)
 The Captain (novel)

References

Footnotes

Bibliography

Further reading

External links

 "Convoys to North Russia, 1942" London Gazette 13th October, 1950
 Allies and Lend-Lease Museum'', Moscow
 MOD veterans' agency
 German account of Rösselsprung 
 Soviet account on the war in Arctic and the convoys: Admiral Nikolai Gerasimovich Kuznetsov
 Murmansk Run: Arctic Convoys to Russia: free print-and-play boardgame.
 Naval History.net
 The Quiet Courage of Chief Steward Horace Carswell DSM, MM, BEM during Convoy PQ.17
 Coxswain Sid Kerslake of armed trawler "Northern Gem" and the Russian Convoys
 Convoy PQ.17 Primary source diary and supporting material by Jack Bowman, ERA aboard HMS La Malouine.
 Lend-Lease, Northern Convoys from the Voice of Russia website
 The Norwegian Merchant Fleet
 Pathe Newsreel video of HMS Scylla fighting the Luftwaffe while protecting convoy PQ 18
 Royal Canadian Navy in the Second World War
 Thank you, Brave Comrade

 
Arctic naval operations of World War II
Economic aid during World War II
Air
Military in the Arctic
Soviet Union–United States relations
Soviet Union–United Kingdom relations
Foreign trade of the Soviet Union
Naval battles and operations of World War II involving the United Kingdom